Det har jag ångrat tusenfalt is a 2004 studio album by Swedish band Drifters.

Track listing
Det har jag ångrat tusenfalt (Björn Alriksson, Jan-Eric Karlzon, Ann Persson)
Låt aldrig natten ta slut (Jan-Eric Karlzon)
För din skull (Björn Alriksson, Ann Persson)
Det finns ingenting att hämta (Blame it on the Bossa Nova) (Barry Mann, Cynthia Weil, Stig Rossner)
Kan du förlåta (Z. Martinsson, Britt A. Nilsson)
Seven Years (Wolfgang Jass, Wolff-Eckehardt Stein)
Nu lifter vindarna (Tommy Gunnarsson, Elisabeth Lord)
Ännu en gång (Lars Sigfridsson)
Kommer tid, kommer råd (Tommy Gunnarsson, Elisabeth Lord)
Kärlekens låga (Lennart Dahlberg, Magnus Ekwall)
Ring till mig (Tommy Gunnarsson, Tommy Gunnarsson, Elisabeth Lord)
Komm heim (Peter Dahl, Thomas Holmstrand, Linda Jansson, Rudolf Müssig)
Jedes Mal wenn du forgehst von mir  (Björn Alriksson, Rudolf Müssig, Ann Persson)

References 

2004 albums
Drifters (Swedish band) albums